The 1992 Southwest Conference women's basketball tournament was held March 11–14, 1992, at Moody Coliseum in Dallas, Texas. 

Number 1 seed  defeated 2 seed  76-74 to win their 1st championship and receive the conference's automatic bid to the 1992 NCAA tournament.

Format and seeding 
The tournament consisted of an 8 team single-elimination tournament.

Tournament

References 

Southwest Conference women's Basketball Tournament
1992 in American women's basketball
1992 in sports in Texas
1990s in Dallas
Basketball in Dallas